Hedleyhope may refer to:

Hedleyhope (parish), containing East Hedleyhope, village in County Durham, England
Hedleyhope Fell, nature reserve in County Durham, England